Crosby & Nash is a double album by Crosby & Nash, released in 2004, the duo's fourth and final studio recording. It was the first studio album by the duo since Whistling Down the Wire 28 years earlier, and proved to be the final album of original material by any grouping of Crosby, Stills, Nash & Young in quartet, trio, or duo configuration. In 2006, a truncated version of this album appeared containing 13 of its tracks on one disc. The song "Michael (Hedges Here)" is in tribute to their friend, guitarist Michael Hedges, who died in 1997. The core band for the album includes James Raymond and Jeff Pevar from Crosby's CPR project, session musicians Leland Sklar and Russ Kunkel who played with Crosby and Nash in the 1970s, and guitarist Dean Parks. All tracks were recorded from January 12, 2004, through February 12, 2004, at Center Staging in Burbank, California and at Kazoo Studios in Kauai.

Track listing

Personnel 
 David Crosby – vocals, acoustic guitar
 Graham Nash – vocals, electric piano, acoustic guitar, harmonica
 James Raymond – keyboards
 Matt Rollings – acoustic piano (8, 15, 16)
 Dean Parks – electric guitars, acoustic guitar 
 Jeff Pevar – electric guitars, acoustic guitar 
 Steve Farris – electric guitars (15)
 Dan Dugmore – pedal steel guitar (15)
 Leland Sklar – bass
 Russ Kunkel – drums, percussion
 Luis Conte – percussion (5, 11)
 Kate Markowitz – backing vocals (15)
 Arnold McCuller – backing vocals (15)
 Windy Wagner — backing vocals (15)

Production personnel
 Nathaniel Kunkel – producer, recording, mixing
 David Crosby, Russ Kunkel and Graham Nash – co-producers
 Kevin Plessner, Christine Sirous and Seth Waldmann – assistant engineers
 John Hurst – system engineer 
 Robert Hadley and Doug Sax – mastering at The Mastering Lab (Hollywood, California)
 Kinski Gallo – art direction, photography, cover photography 
 Edward Chen – design 
 David "Mr. Bonzai" Goggin – photography
 Buzz Person – photography

References

External links
 Crosby & Nash Official Website

2004 albums
Albums produced by Stephen Barncard
Sanctuary Records albums
Crosby & Nash albums